Missouri Buttes are located in Crook County in northeast Wyoming on the northwest flank of the Black Hills Uplift.

The butte peaks form a rough rectangle 0.5 x 0.65 mi. in size.

As with Devils Tower, the buttes are composed of igneous intrusive phonolite which exhibits columnar jointing.  The rocks of the buttes have been interpreted to be part of a laccolith, a magmatic stock or volcano conduits that became exposed at the surface after overlying rocks eroded away.

References

Landforms of Crook County, Wyoming
Buttes of Wyoming
Volcanism of Wyoming